Dmytro Monatyk (born 1 April 1986 in Lutsk), professionally known as MONATIK, is a Ukrainian singer, songwriter, dancer, composer.

He opened the first semi-final of the Eurovision Song Contest 2017 on 9 May.

Biography

Early years 
From 2000 to 2006, he was a member of the Lutsk Breakdance Group 'DBS Crew', which became the best 'B-boy' group in west Ukraine. In 2003, he went to the Law Faculty of the Interregional Academy of Personnel Management, where in his free time he danced and learned music. After finishing his university he received the specialization of a lawyer.

Popularity 
In 2008, he became a finalist during the audition for the show Фабрика зірок - 2 (Star Academy), but he did not become a part of this project. This year singer Natalia Mohylevska asked Dmytro to work on her ballet, during her concert program 'Real O'. This became a true turning point for him, because he agreed and moved to Kyiv.

In 2008, he got together his first music group 'Monatique', which survived through 2 live concerts in Lutsk. They played in the funk and soul genre. In 2009 he passed the audition to join 'D'arts', where during the 2 years he went through a lot of events: in 2010 the ballet 'Girl with the Matches' was set by the director of the ballet, and is part of the cast for the ballet 'The Republic of Qazan Tip'.

Beginning of his solo career 
In the summer of 2011, his first solo song ТайУлетаю came out, whose music video was filmed on a mobile device. During this year many popular stars invited Dmytro to join them in their music videos: Потап і Настя Каменських «Выкрутасы»; гурт «Інфініті» «Ну и пусть»; INKA «Pump it». He was also the choreographer for Йолки's music video «На большом воздушном шаре».

Career growth 
August 2012 - His first steps in the role of a composer; he presented Svitlana Loboda's song 40 degrees («40 градусов») during Crimea Music Fest.

Summer 2012 - He tried himself again in the role of a composer in a few episodes of the project «Альо, Директор!» (English: Hello, director!) with Svitlana Loboda on the channel TET .

In November 2012, Monatik performed on X-Factor (Ukrainian TV series), not as a contender, but as a guest performer.

After he released 3 tracks in 2012 -  («Воздух», «ТерроризирУ. Е.т», «Важно») (English: Air, Terrorising, Difficult) - in March 2013 he initiated an audition for his ballet and chose 4 best dancers. Together they toured with his concert around Ukraine, Belarus and Russia.

In April 2013, quoting press, 'Monatik gave a start to the solo career of Eva Bychmina' by writing her a song - «Собой». The spring and summer of this year was quite successful for him and he presented another 3 tracks to his followers - «Прости…», «Саундтрек сегодняшнЕГО дня» та «ДыМ» (English: Forgive, Soundtrack of Today, Home). In May of the same year, he announced the premiere of his music clip for the song «Прости…» (English: Forgive). June 2013 bought around the premiere of his song «Клавіши» (English: Keys (In this context of an instrument)), which he wrote with his fellow countryman, a Lutsk rapper called KOVALERO.

On 8 November 2013, he presented to the public his new single «Улыбаясь» (English: Smile) with the slogan «Живи, люби, борися — "УЛЫБАЯСЬ"»(English: Live, Love, Fight - Smile).

On 12 December 2014, during his large solo concert in Kyiv, he presented his debut solo album «Саундтрек сегодняшнЕГО дня (С. С. Д.)» (English: Soundtrack of Today).

5 June 2014 - On the internet and on major mainstream music channels he airs his new clip «В лучшем свете» (English: In a Better World), whose director was dancer Анатолій Сачівко. Later, his video receive positive feedback from Алан Бадоєв (English: Alan Badoiiv), one of the best Ukrainian clip-makers.

24 August 2014 - Dmytro released the Ukrainian song «Може, вже досить» (English: Maybe that's enough), which main message was the termination of the war on Donbas between Ukraine and Russia. In November he visited Kyiv, Odessa, Lviv, Dnipro (Dnipropetrovsk), Kharkiv with his tour «Сейчас» (English: Now). This happened when he released his single of the same name.

At the beginning of 2015, he participated in two successful duets with his own songs -  with Anna Sedokova (song «Тише» (English: Quieter)) and «Quest Pistols Show» (song «Мокрая» (English: Wet)). Both songs had music videos which accompanied them.

25 May 2016, marked his second album «Звучит» (English: Sounds), which as made up of 16 tracks.

In February 2017, there was news that Monatik was meant to perform in Moscow, however this event was later cancelled because of political reasons.

9 May 2017 - Dmytro performed during the opening of the first semi-final of the Eurovision Song Contest 2017 in Kyiv, where he sung his song «Кружит» (English: Spinning) in English.

In Spring 2017, he became a Judge on the Ukrainian Dancing With The Stars, season 2 program.

In 2017, he took part as a coach in the Ukrainian The Voice Kids, season 4, which occurred during the second half of 2017. The winner of that seasons Voice Kids was Danelia Tyleshova, who was in Monatik's team.

His show «Vitamin D», the presentation of which occurred during October 2017 in Palace of Sports, Kyiv, was acknowledged as the «Best Concert Show» according to the musical award YUNA, and the TV award «TeleTriumph». The broadcasting of the show happened on 1+1 during New Year's Eve.

In January 2018, he made an appearance for an advertisement with the Russian operator MegaFon.

In April 2018, Monatik released a single track «Цей день» (English: This Day) with Nina Matviyenko, and in July he released a single with Nadya Dorofeeva called «Глубоко» (English: Deep).

Albums

Саундтрек сегодняшнЕГО дня (С. С. Д.) (2013) (English: Soundtrack of Today) 
 «Intro» (English: Intro)
 «Дым» (English: Home)
 «ТайУлетаю» (English: I Flew Away)
 «Важно» (English: Difficult)
 «Саундтрек сегодняшнЕГО дня (С. С. Д.)» (English: Soundtrack of Today)
 «Воздух» (English: Air) 
 «Прости…» (English: Forgive)
 «Улыбаясь» (English: Smile)
 «В лучшем свете» (English: In a Better World)
 «Жадная» (English: Greedy)
 «ТерроризирУ. Е.т» (English: Terrorises)
 «Прости…» (GreenLeto & Sam Radeo Remix) [Extended Version] (English: Forgive)
 «Важно» (live acoustic version) (feat. Open Kids) (English: Difficult)

Звучит (2016) (English: Sounds) 
 Мудрые деревья (English: Smart Trees) 
 Кружит (English: Spinning)
 Тише (з Анною Сєдоковою) (English: Quieter)
 Музыкально-танцевальная терапия (English: Musical-Dancing Therapy)
 Пока ты на танцполе (English: Whilst you're on the dancefloor)
 Мокрая (з Quest Pistols Show) (English: Wet)
 Путь (English: Path)
 УВЛИУВТ (Упали в любовь и ударились в танцы) (English: We fell in love and hit up dancing)
 Каждый из нас (English: Everyone of us)
 Ещё один (English: Another one)
 Засияем (English: Light up)
 Сейчас (English: Now)
 Вот наше время! (English: Here's our time!)
 Выходной (English: Holiday)
 Ты... (English: You)
 Вечность (English: Eternity)

Singles 
 «ТайУлетаю» (2011) (English: I Flew Away)
 «Воздух» (2012) (English: Air)
 «ТерроризирУ. Е.т» (2012) (English: Terrorizing)
 «Важно» (2012) (English: Difficult)
 «Прости…»(2013) (English: Forgive)
 «Клавіші» (ft. KOVALERO) (2013) (English: Keys (In the context of an instrument))
 «Саундтрек сегодняшнЕГО дня» (2013) (English: Soundtrack of Today)
 «Дым» (2013) (English: Home)
 «Улыбаясь» (2013) (English: Smile)
 «В лучшем свете» (2014) (English: In a Better World)
 «Може, вже досить» (2014) (English: Maybe that's enough)
 «Сейчас» (2014) (English: Now)
 «Тише» (з Ганною Сєдоковою) (2015) (English: Quieter)
 «Мокрая» (з Quest Pistols Show) (2015) (English: Wet)
 «Выходной» (2015) (English: Holiday)
 «Друг мой дорогой» (саундтрек «По той бік»/«По ту сторону») (2016) (English: Friend, my dear (Soundtrack to On the other side))
 Vitamin D (2017) (English: Vitamin D)
«То, о чего без ума» (English: That, What Makes Me Crazy)
«Цей день» (ft. Ніна Матвієнко) (English: This Day)
«Глубоко…» (ft. Надя Дорофеева) (English: Deep)

Music videos

Took part in these music videos

Film and TV 
 Appears in some episodes of  «Повернення Мухтара» та «Щоденники темного». (English: The Return of Myhtar and the Diaries of the Dark).
 He took part in the show Танцюють всі-3 (English: Everyone Dances-3).
 He was a finalist in the show X-Factor Ukraine.
 2012 - Becomes a finalist in the show «Зірковий ринг» (English: Star ring).
 2016 - Coach in The Voice Kids Ukraine on the Ukrainian Channel 1+1.
 2016 - He took part in the Ukrainian voice-over for the movie Sing, where he voice Eddie the Sheep
 2 Feb 2017 - Advert for Samsung with Monatik featured.
 Aug 2017 - Became a judge in the second season of the Ukrainian Dancing with the Stars.
2018 - Played a role in the comedy «Скажене весілля» (English: Crazy Wedding).

Nominations and awards

References

Links
Eurovision Song Contest 2017 performance

Living people
English-language singers from Ukraine
1986 births
People from Lutsk
Interregional Academy of Personnel Management alumni
Ukrainian pop singers
Ukrainian singer-songwriters
21st-century Ukrainian singers
21st-century Ukrainian male singers
Russian National Music Award winners